The Indian Evidence Act, originally passed in India by the Imperial Legislative Council in 1872, during the British Raj, contains a set of rules and allied issues governing admissibility of evidence in the Indian courts of law.

Importance

The enactment and adoption of the Indian Evidence Act was a path-breaking judicial measure introduced in India, which changed the entire system of concepts pertaining to admissibility of evidences in the Indian courts of law. Until then, the rules of evidences were based on the traditional legal systems of different social groups and communities of India and were different for different people depending on caste, community, faith and social position. The Indian Evidence Act introduced a standard set of law applicable to all Indians.

The law is mainly based upon the firm work by Sir James Fitzjames Stephen, who could be called the founding father of this comprehensive piece of legislation.

The Act

The Indian Evidence Act, identified as Act no. 1 of 1872, and called the Indian Evidence Act, 1872, has eleven chapters and 167 sections, and came into force 1 September 1872. At that time, India was a part of the British Empire. Over a period of more than 125 years since its enactment, the Indian Evidence Act has basically retained its original form except certain amendments from time to time.

Amendments:

The Criminal Law Amendment Act, 2005
The Criminal Law (Amendment) Act, 2018 (22 of 2018)
The Jammu & Kashmir Reorganization Act, 2019

Applicability

When India gained independence on 15 August 1947, the Act continued to be in force throughout the Republic of India and Pakistan,., Since the independence of Bangladesh in 26 March 1971, it is in use throughout Bangladesh though some necessary amendments have been made. After 1947, the Act continues in force in India, but it was repealed in Pakistan in 1984 by the Evidence Order 1984 (also known as the "Qanun-e-Shahadat"). It also applies to all judicial proceedings in the court, including the court martial. However, it does not apply on affidavits and arbitration.

Contents
This Act is divided   into three parts and there are 11 chapters in total under this Act.
Part 1
Part 1 deals with relevancy of the facts. There are two chapters under this part: the first chapter is a preliminary chapter which introduces to the Evidence Act and the second chapter specifically deals with the relevancy of the facts.

Part 2
Part 2 consists of chapters from 3 to 6. Chapter 3 deals with facts which need not be proved, chapter 4 deals with oral evidence, chapter 5 deals with documentary evidence  and chapter 6 deals with circumstances when documentary evidence has been given preference over the oral evidence.

Part 3
The last part, that is part 3, consists of chapter 7 to chapter 11. Chapter 7 talks about the burden of proof. Chapter 8 talks about estoppel, chapter 9 talks about witnesses, chapter 10 talks about examination of witnesses, and last chapter which is chapter 11 talks about improper admission and rejection of evidence.

Indian Evidence Act Classic Classification

In the Evidence Act All the Provisions can be divided into two Categories
(1) Taking the Evidence (By Court)
(2) Evaluation

Taking Evidence : Parties to a proceeding before a court of law can adduce only admissible evidence. Admissible evidence are either "Fact in issue" or "Relevant Facts" which are not excluded from being adduced by any other provisions of Indian Evidence Act, 1872. Section 3 of the Act defined Fact, Fact in issue and Relevant Facts.

According to section 59 and 60, facts can be proved by two ways, One is Orally and Second is Documentary (includes Electronic Documents), Oral Evidence mostly suggest the Verbal deposition before the Court (and not other wise), and Which includes oral statement regarding materials too, Documentary Evidence suggest the Documents. So The Evidence Regarding Matter which have number of Facts, for which Evidence by way of oral or Documentary produced before the court for its Evaluation for either one fact or facts. Court by going through those Documentary Evidence and Oral Evidence decide that particular fact and all facts are proved or not, or whether the fact or facts can be presumed to be proved?

In Evaluation as above said by looking into the Oral and Documentary Evidence Court decide whether particular fact is proved or not, or facts are proved or not, In Evaluation there are two concepts to prove facts; One is Prove (Prove, Disprove or Not prove) and Other is Presumption (that fact is proved) (may Presume, Shall presume and Conclusive proof) After going to Oral and Documentary Evidence Court see that whether any fact or facts are proved by looking to such evidence or not? If at all no evidence is given or enough evidence is given for the fact its said fact is 'Not proved'; The second Concept for evaluation is "Presumption" In Evidence many Section suggest these presumptions, Where there is said Facts 'may presume', Court is extremely free to believe it or not and may ask to prove the fact, According to section 4 in 'shall presume' court has no discretion and should consider the fact as proved unless it is disproved, Where in any provision it is said that particular fact, or particular fact in particular circumstances must be concluded as "conclusive proof' Court has to regard it as proved and shall not allow parties to adduce evidence to rebut it.

Classification of Evidence Act in Four Questions
Evidence Act may be divided in four questions.

Question 1      What is the Evidence given of?

Answer 1        of Facts ("Facts In Issue" or "Relevant Facts")

Question 2      How the Evidence of such Facts are Given

Answer 2        The Evidence of Such Facts is Given Either by way of "Oral Evidence" or "Documentary Evidence'

Question 3      On whom does the Burden of proof lie?

Answer 3        "Burden of Proof"(of particular fact) or "Onus of proof" (to prove whole case) lies on the Prosecution incharge

Question 4      What are the Evaluation of the Facts.

Answer 4        The Evaluation is "Prove" or "Presumption"(of prove); The fact is either 'proved','disproved', or 'Not proved'; or there may be presumption that proof of facts "may presume', 'shall presume', or 'conclusive proof'.

References

External links
 The Indian Evidence Act Including the Amendment by Act 10 of 2009.
I.E.A (Mobile Friendly)

 क्या है भारतीय साक्ष्य अधिनियम, 1872?

Evidence law
Acts of the Imperial Legislative Council
Repealed Pakistani legislation
1872 in British law